The Amsterdam Mohawks are a collegiate summer baseball team based in Amsterdam, New York. The team plays in the Perfect Game Collegiate Baseball League (PGCBL). The Mohawks, who were located in Schenectady prior to 2003, won the championship in 1988 under head coach and former team owner/president Bob Bellizzi.

The team's first year in Amsterdam, the Mohawks captured the title in 2003 under head coach Bill Consiglio, and again in 2004 under head coach Nicholas Enriquez. In 2009, current head coach Keith Griffin took over. The team has since won 8 more championships, in 2009, 2010, 2012, 2013, 2014, 2016, 2019, and 2022.

In 2011, after playing in the New York Collegiate Baseball League for over 30 years, the Amsterdam Mohawks became members of a newly formed league, the Perfect Game Collegiate Baseball League which combined some of the better summer baseball franchises in the nation and partnered them with Perfect Game USA, the world's leader in scouting and reporting services. The Perfect Game Collegiate Baseball League is a ten team summer league played throughout upstate New York.

In addition to Amsterdam, the PGCBL consists of teams located in Albany, Alburn, Batavia, Boonville, Elmira, Geneva, Glens Falls, Jamestown, Little Falls, Newark, Niagara, Oneonta, Saugerties, Utica, and Watertown. It is one of the most elite wood bat summer leagues in America. To be eligible to play in the PGCBL, a player must have completed at least one year of college and must still have at least one year of playing eligibility remaining. Each team is allowed two exceptions to that rule where graduating seniors are eligible to play, though the players must first be approved by Perfect Game USA. They must also be enrolled full-time at a college or university. Beginning in early June, each team in the league will play a 48-game schedule, which will wind down in early August.

In addition, there have been over 100 former Mohawks who have signed professional baseball contracts, including San Francisco Giants star Hunter Pence (Texas-Arlington) who played for the Mohawks in 2002, Luke Maile (University of Kentucky), Logan Darnell (University of Kentucky), Cord Phelps (Stanford), Brendan Harris (William and Mary), Glen Barker (Saint Rose College), Valentino Pascucci (University of Oklahoma), Tim Christman (Siena College), Mark Leiter Jr. (NJIT), Trey Wingenter (Auburn University), Chandler Shepherd (University of Kentucky), John Nogowski (Florida State University), Zach Logue (University of Kentucky) and Matt Gage (Siena College). The Mohawks currently have 60 former players playing professional baseball.

League awards

Team single season records

All-time Team Records

References

1978 establishments in New York (state)
Baseball teams established in 1978
Amateur baseball teams in New York (state)
Montgomery County, New York